Garfield Peak may refer to:

 Garfield Peak (Colorado)
 Garfield Peak (Oregon)
 Garfield Peak (Wyoming)

See also
 Mount Garfield (disambiguation)
Garfield Mountain (disambiguation)